Congjapyx is a genus of diplurans in the family Japygidae.

Species
 Congjapyx constrictus Pagés & Schowing, 1958
 Congjapyx hirtus Pagés & Schowing, 1958
 Congjapyx insidiator Pagés & Schowing, 1958
 Congjapyx insolans Pagés & Schowing, 1958
 Congjapyx intermedius Pagés & Schowing, 1958
 Congjapyx kabarensis Pagés & Schowing, 1958
 Congjapyx longipilus Pagés & Schowing, 1958
 Congjapyx schoutedini Pagés, 1954

References

Diplura